John A. "Jocko" Flynn (June 30, 1864 – December 31, 1907) was an American Major League Baseball player for the Chicago White Stockings who played pitcher only in the 1886 season, during which the team again won the National League championship. Flynn's 23 victories were the most ever logged by a pitcher who only pitched a single season in the major leagues.

Career

During this rookie year, Flynn developed arm problems which prevented him from appearing in the 1886 World Series, a best of seven contest that was ultimately won by the St. Louis Browns of the American Association, four games to two. Flynn's loss was painfully felt by the club, which also saw pitcher Jim McCormick go down after the second game of the series with a chronic foot ailment. Teams of the era typically only carried three pitchers and the loss of both Flynn and McCormick left the Chicagos with only their ace, future Hall of Famer John Clarkson, who was forced to start four of the six contests, going the distance in three.

Flynn was very small of stature, so much so that he was mistaken for the Chicago team mascot, Willie Hahn, and taunted by St. Louis fans after game 4 of the World Series. 

Flynn's arm ailment kept him from pitching again. His 23 wins is the most ever by a pitcher who pitched in only one season in the major leagues.

References

External links

1864 births
1907 deaths
19th-century baseball players
Major League Baseball pitchers
Chicago White Stockings players
Lawrence (minor league baseball) players
Meriden Maroons players
Omaha Omahogs players
Omaha Lambs players
Oakland Greenhood & Morans players
Stockton (minor league baseball) players
Baseball players from Massachusetts
Sportspeople from Lawrence, Massachusetts